Gould City is a ghost town in Alcona Township, Rooks County, Kansas, United States.

History
There is nothing left of Gould City.

References

Former populated places in Rooks County, Kansas
Former populated places in Kansas